KPJK (channel 60) is a non-commercial independent television station licensed to San Mateo, California, United States, serving the San Francisco Bay Area. Owned by Northern California Public Media (not to be confused with Northern California Public Broadcasting), it is sister to PBS member station KRCB (channel 22) and NPR member stations KRCB-FM (104.9) and KRCG-FM (91.1). KPJK's studios are located on West Hillsdale Boulevard on the campus of the College of San Mateo in southwestern San Mateo, and its transmitter is located atop Sutro Tower in San Francisco.

KPJK operates 24 hours a day with programming coming from American Public Television and other independent producers. Previously, the station was owned by the College of San Mateo, and operated as KCSM-TV.

History
The KCSM stations were originally established by the College of San Mateo as college radio and student television station training facilities for radio and television broadcasters. Many well-known media personalities were educated at CSM, including tabloid television reporter Steve Wilson, San Francisco Giants announcer Jon Miller and K101 on-air personality Jeff Serr.

Between 1964 and 1980, CSM offered a full range of courses in broadcasting and broadcast electronics, unusual for a community college; they were much more extensive than better known four-year university programs. The television station and its companion FM radio outlet were staffed and operated by students. This was discontinued in the 1980s, and today KCSM is operated by professional broadcasters.

Television
KCSM-TV first signed on the air on October 12, 1964; the station was founded by Dr. Jacob H. Wiens, chair of the electronics department at the College of San Mateo. It was originally a member station of National Educational Television until 1970, when that service was succeeded by the Public Broadcasting Service (PBS). During its early years, broadcasting on channel 14, it operated on campus from black and white studios with 13,800 watts of power from a transmitter at the college, comparable to today's low-power stations. In 1979, KCSM reached a deal with Spanish International Network station KDTV to begin operating from its full-power color facilities and moved to channel 60 atop San Bruno Mountain's Radio Peak on March 5, 1979, KDTV subsequently moved to UHF channel 14.

KCSM ceased regular programming on its analog signal, over UHF channel 60, on May 15, 2004, due to a costly rent increase for full-power transmitter space. The station ran a billboard for the next several days advising viewers that they would only operate its digital signal from then on, though it continues to be available through cable. KCSM shut down its analog signal nine days later, on May 24. On May 3, 2005, KCSM received Special Temporary Authorization from the FCC to restore its analog signal at low power, operating on the campus of the College of San Mateo. It briefly simulcast the Jazz TV (60.3) feed for two hours every evening, with the rest of the broadcast day being a simulcast of KCSM (FM), but now offers only the simulcast (with relevant video "bulletin board" screens).

In March 2006, the Federal Communications Commission levied a $15,000 fine against KCSM for content in the documentary, The Blues: Godfathers and Sons, which the station had aired in March 2004. The series documented the birth and worldwide influence of the blues as a musical genre. One installment contained interviews with artists and others who expressed their feelings of oppression by the music industry, including the use of variations of the words "fuck" and "shit." The FCC determined the content to be "indecent." According to the FCC, "The gratuitous and repeated use of this language in a program that San Mateo aired at a time when children were expected to be in the audience is shocking." Within days of the decision, law firms from across the country offered their services pro bono to fight the ruling. Because of the upswell of support, KCSM requested an extension of time to file its appeal.

KCSM dropped its membership with PBS in 2009, and became an independent public television station (KCET, downstate in Los Angeles, would follow suit in January 2011; however, it would rejoin PBS in 2019). KCSM-TV retained an affiliation with MHz Worldview for programming feeds on its second digital subchannel.

Sale
On December 7, 2011, the San Mateo County Community College District announced plans to sell KCSM-TV, due to budgetary constraints as well as an operating deficit of $1 million. KCSM radio would continue operations as usual. All bids in response to the initial request for proposals to purchase the television station were rejected on October 24, 2012 and the district subsequently issued a second request for proposals. On May 15, 2013, the district approved an agreement with LocusPoint Networks, who will provide a $900,000 annual subsidy for up to four years and then split the proceeds of an auction of its spectrum allocation sometime in the next few years. The KCSM-TV spectrum is expected to be sold for upwards of $10 million to wireless communication companies.

On July 15, 2013, KCSM dropped most of the programming syndicated by public television distributors (with the exception of those airing as part of a discrete afternoon block), moving the MHz Worldview feed to its main channel. It brought back aforementioned programming on July 15, 2014.

, LocusPoint Networks, hired by the district to sell the station due to its $1 million annual losses, claim fiscal mismanagement and incompetence by school officials and administrators to fulfill their basic obligations to facilitate the sale properly. In turn, the District has counter-sued LocusPoint, a multi-station operator, and its partner, PricewaterhouseCoopers for failure to enter KCSM-TV into the FCC auction. Nonetheless, the station has continuously run a deficit for many years, with viewers citing programming that is irrelevant and uninteresting for a typical public television station.

As KPJK
On September 7, 2017, Sonoma County public television station KRCB (channel 22) announced that it would acquire KCSM-TV for $12 million. The Rural California Broadcasting Corporation applied to change the station's call letters to KPJK; the call letters were chosen to honor John Kramer, a professor at Sonoma State University who founded KRCB with his wife, Nancy Dobbs, in 1984. On October 24, LocusPoint Networks filed a lawsuit to block the sale to KRCB, claiming that the sale is not valid and violates its contract with KCSM-TV.

On July 31, 2018, KRCB took control of KCSM-TV and the call letters were changed to KPJK. Though KRCB sought to have KPJK rejoin PBS, its membership request was denied due to overlap with San Francisco's main PBS station, KQED (channel 9), as PBS has sought to eliminate duplication of programming within the same market. The station also continues to simulcast KCSM radio on subchannel 60.5, under the branding "KCSM Jazz TV", even though the radio station was retained by the San Mateo County Community College District.

Technical information

Subchannels
The station's digital signal is multiplexed:

References

External links

Television channels and stations established in 1964
1964 establishments in California
PJK
Public television in the United States
First Nations Experience affiliates